Filair was an airline based in the Democratic Republic of the Congo. It operated from N'Dolo Airport in Kinshasa. The airline was on the list of air carriers banned in the European Union, as well as all airlines regulated by the authorities in the DRC.

Destinations 
It operated regional flights to Boma, Idiofa, Kikwit, Matadi and Muanda, among others.

Fleet 

Antonov AN-24B
Let L-410 UVP-E Turbolet 
 9Q-CCN (Destroyed on 25 August 2010)
 9Q-CDN

Former fleet
Douglas DC-6A
Douglas DC-7C
Lockheed L-188CF Electra
Lockheed L-188PF Electra
Vickers Viscount

Accidents and incidents 
9Q-CTS, a Vickers Viscount Type 757, was written off in 1988 while landing at Tshikapa Airport (TSH/FZUK) 
9Q-CGD, a Lockheed L-188PF Electra, was written off in Angola in July 1994.
9Q-CCN, a Let L-410, crashed, 20 fatalities on 25 August 2010. See 2010 Bandundu Filair Let L-410 crash.

References

External links

Defunct airlines of the Democratic Republic of the Congo
Companies based in Kinshasa
1987 establishments in Zaire
Airlines established in 1987
2015 disestablishments in the Democratic Republic of the Congo
Airlines disestablished in 2015